East Main station will be an at-grade Sound Transit East Link light rail station in the city of Bellevue, Washington. It is expected to open along with the section of the line to Overlake in 2024.

Location 

The station will be located at the intersection of Main St and 112th Ave SE, just west of Interstate 405 on the outskirts of Downtown Bellevue. The station will be at-grade, but just north of this station, the route will enter the Downtown Bellevue tunnel, remaining underground until it reaches the Bellevue Downtown station where it will emerge above ground, quickly becoming an elevated span to cross Interstate 405. The ballot measure that approved East Link in 2008 initially planned for the Downtown Bellevue portion of the route to be at-grade, however, the City of Bellevue committed to $185 million in cost-sharing to finance the tunnel.

Once completed, the station will offer similar amenities to existing Link light rail stations, including ticket vending machines, bicycle parking, public art, and a new park over the portal of the Downtown Bellevue tunnel, which will offer a new multi-use path to connect the station to Main Street, as well as the Surrey Downs neighborhood.

References 

Future Link light rail stations
Link light rail stations in King County, Washington
Buildings and structures in Bellevue, Washington
Railway stations scheduled to open in 2024